Carpenter-Lippincott House is a historic home located at Centreville, New Castle County, Delaware.  It was built about 1840, and is a three-story, stuccoed stone dwelling in the Italianate-style. It consists of two, well-defined rectangular blocks.  The main block is surmounted by a square cupola on its low-hipped roof with projecting eaves and it features an enclosed porch with cast iron lattice work.

It was listed on the National Register of Historic Places in 1983.

References

Houses on the National Register of Historic Places in Delaware
Houses completed in 1840
Italianate architecture in Delaware
Houses in New Castle County, Delaware
National Register of Historic Places in New Castle County, Delaware